Dinitrobenzenes are chemical compounds composed of a benzene ring and two nitro group (-NO2) substituents.  The three possible arrangements of the nitro groups afford three isomers, 1,2-dinitrobenzene, 1,3-dinitrobenzene, and 1,4-dinitrobenzene. Each isomer has the chemical formula C6H4N2O4 and a molar mass of about 168.11 g/mol. 1,3-Dinitrobenzene is the most common isomer and it is used in the manufacture of explosives.

Properties 
The dinitrobenzenes are all crystalline solids. The boiling points of the three isomers are relatively close; however, the melting points significantly differ. 1,4-Dinitrobenzene, which has the highest symmetry, has the highest melting point.

References 

Nitrobenzenes